The 18th British Academy Film Awards, given by the British Academy of Film and Television Arts in 1965, honoured the best films of 1964.

Winners and nominees
Source:

Statistics

References

Film018
1964 film awards
1965 in British cinema